Alexander Ure, 1st Baron Strathclyde,  (22 February 1853 – 2 October 1928) was a Scottish politician, judge, and georgist land value tax activist.

Life
He was the son of John Ure, Lord Provost of Glasgow, and his wife Isabella.

He studied law at the University of Glasgow he was admitted to membership of the Faculty of Advocates in 1878.

He was Liberal Member of Parliament for Linlithgowshire from 1895 to 1913. He became a Queen's Counsel in 1897.

He provided as Solicitor General for Scotland from December 1905
to 1909, and as Lord Advocate from February 1909 to 1913. He was an enthusiastic supporter of Lloyd George's 1909–10 budget. He was sworn of the Privy Council in 1909. In 1909, he conducted the prosecution of Oscar Slater for murder; the conviction was later quashed on appeal.

During his working life he lived at 31 Heriot Row, a large Georgian townhouse, in Edinburgh's Second New Town.

On leaving Parliament he was raised to the bench as Lord Strathclyde and appointed Lord Justice General, a post he held until 1920. He was raised to the Peerage as Baron Strathclyde, of Sandyford in the County of Lanark, in 1914. In 1917, he was appointed to the Order of the British Empire as a Knight Grand Cross. He is said to have been skilled in cross-examination, and was more suited to life as an advocate than as a judge.

He retired to his father's house of Cairndhu in Helensburgh in 1920 and died there in 1928. He is buried in Helensburgh Cemetery.

Notable trials
Ure famously oversaw the trial of alleged murderer, Oscar Slater, now seen as a serious mis-trial. Although Ure sentenced him to death in 1909. The sentence was commuted to life imprisonment. Following a campaign by Arthur Conan Doyle and others, Slater received a pardon, but only after having served 18 years in Peterhead Prison.

Family
In 1879 he married Margaret McDowell Steven. their only child was a daughter, Chruistopbel Helen Ure, who died in 1918, before the Baron's death.

The peerage therefore became extinct on his death.

References

External links 
 

1853 births
1928 deaths
Knights Grand Cross of the Order of the British Empire
Ure, Alexander
Ure, Alexander
Senators of the College of Justice
Lord Advocates
Solicitors General for Scotland
Barons Strathclyde
Ure, Alexander
Ure, Alexander
Ure, Alexander
Ure, Alexander
Ure, Alexander
Ure, Alexander
Lords President of the Court of Session
Lords Justice-General
Members of the Faculty of Advocates
Scottish King's Counsel
19th-century King's Counsel
Members of the Privy Council of the United Kingdom
Members of the Judicial Committee of the Privy Council
Barons created by George V